Kestler is a German surname. Notable people with the surname include:

 Hans Günther Kestler (1939–2013), German chess master
 Izabela Maria Furtado Kestler (1959–2009), Brazilian professor of German studies

See also
 Kessler (name)

German-language surnames

Occupational surnames